Andrew John Dowie (born 25 March 1983 in Bellshill) is a Scottish professional footballer who plays for Caledonian Braves. Dowie is predominantly a centre-back and played for Rangers, Brechin City, Partick Thistle, Stranraer, Ross County, Dunfermline Athletic, Queen of the South and Dumbarton in the SPFL.

Career
Dowie started his career as a youth with Rangers, during which time he had a loan spell at Brechin City in 2004 and scored in a friendly win against Linfield.

After being released by Rangers, having only made one league appearance for the club, he signed for Partick Thistle. At Partick he scored his first career goal in a Scottish League Cup tie against future club Dunfermline. On 13 April 2005, along with teammate Steve Fulton, he was released by Partick Thistle for "a severe breach of club discipline."

Dowie then signed for Stranraer and following the club's relegation to the Scottish Second Division, joined Ross County for the 2006–07 season. While at Ross County he scored in the 2006 Scottish Challenge Cup Final as they went on to beat Clyde on penalties.

After three years at Ross County, Dowie signed for Dunfermline Athletic in May 2009. Whilst at Dunfermline, the club won the 2010–11 Scottish First Division and were promoted to the Scottish Premier League, however they were relegated the following season. During the 2012–13 season, Dunfermline entered administration, with Dowie amongst the players made redundant. On 29 March 2013, he signed for a second time in his career with Partick Thistle. Dowie's contract was not renewed at the end of the 2012–13 season.

Dowie signed for Queen of the South on 1 July 2013. Prior to kick-off in the 1–0 home victory over Hibernian on 2 March 2016, Dowie was presented with a club memento to recognise completion of 100 first team appearances for the club. His contract with Queens wasn't renewed in May 2017, and so he left the club having made 147 appearances across 4 seasons.

On 12 June 2017, Dowie joined rival Scottish Championship club Dumbarton on a one-year contract. He was announced as the club's new captain on 12 July 2017, replacing Darren Barr who had left the club to join Morton. In his first season at the club he was named as the club's Player of the Year and captained the team during the 2017–18 Scottish Challenge Cup final. He signed a new deal in May 2018 but left the club to pursue a career outside football in January 2019 after 74 appearances and 2 goals. In February 2019 Dowie featured for Lowland Football League side Edusport Academy for whom he is also a coach.

Dowie played a season with Cumnock before agreeing to rejoin Caledonian Braves in June 2020.

Career statistics

See also
Dunfermline Athletic F.C. season 2009–10 | 2010–11 | 11–12 | 12–13
Partick Thistle F.C. season 2012–13

Honours
Ross County
Scottish Challenge Cup: 2006–07

References

External links

1983 births
Living people
Footballers from Bellshill
Scottish footballers
Rangers F.C. players
Ross County F.C. players
Brechin City F.C. players
Stranraer F.C. players
Partick Thistle F.C. players
Dunfermline Athletic F.C. players
Queen of the South F.C. players
Scottish Football League players
Scotland under-21 international footballers
Association football defenders
Scottish Premier League players
Scottish Professional Football League players
Dumbarton F.C. players